The women's 400 metres event at the 2007 European Athletics U23 Championships was held in Debrecen, Hungary, at Gyulai István Atlétikai Stadion on 12 and 13 July.

Medalists

Results

Final
13 July

Heats
12 July
Qualified: first 2 in each heat and 2 best to the Final

Heat 1

Heat 2

Heat 3

Participation
According to an unofficial count, 22 athletes from 15 countries participated in the event.

 (1)
 (1)
 (1)
 (3)
 (1)
 (3)
 (1)
 (1)
 (1)
 (1)
 (3)
 (1)
 (1)
 (2)
 (1)

References

400 metres
400 metres at the European Athletics U23 Championships